Breakin' News is the eighth studio album by American rapper E-40 released on September 9, 2003, on Sick Wid It and Jive Records. Soundscan reported that the album sold 50,000 copies in its first week on shelves.

The song "Act A Ass" featuring singer Rankin Scroo (with uncredited vocals from rappers Kaveo & Young Mugzi) is featured in the film Be Cool (2005). The song peaked at #21 on the Bubbling Under R&B/Hip-Hop Songs chart, while Breakin' News's first single, "Quarterbackin'" featuring Clipse peaked at #8 on the same chart.

Track listing

Charts

References

2003 albums
E-40 albums
Albums produced by DJ Quik
Albums produced by Lil Jon
Albums produced by Droop-E
Albums produced by Bosko
Jive Records albums
Sick Wid It Records albums